Hannah Emily Rose Ferguson (born October 12, 1992) is an American model.

Early life
Ferguson's parents met while serving in the U.S. Marine Corps. She stated on the show Model Squad (2018) that her family "had financial struggles". The family went through a phase "without running water for 5 years". After graduating from high school, she won the Kim Dawson Model Search and moved to Dallas to start her career. After six months, she moved to New York City.

Career 
She has appeared in the 2014, 2015, 2016, and 2017 editions of the Sports Illustrated Swimsuit Issue. In her first appearance, she also posed in bodypaint by Joanne Gair. She has also been featured in magazines such as GQ.  Ferguson appeared in advertising for Triumph International, and co-starred with Paris Hilton in a steamy TV commercial for Carl's Jr.

In 2017, Ferguson walked for Max Mara, Alberta Ferretti and Moschino at Milan Fashion Week and opening the 2018 Philipp Plein Resort show. In 2018, she walked for designers including Chloé, Dolce & Gabbana and Chanel. Ferguson also appeared in campaigns for Chanel Beauty and Jimmy Choo's Fever fragrance and was featured on the covers of Vogue Thailand, Elle (Brazil, Portugal), Harper's Bazaar Ukraine and Numéro Russia.

References

External links

Hannah Ferguson on Twitter
Hannah Ferguson on Instagram

1992 births
Female models from Texas
Living people
People from San Angelo, Texas
IMG Models models
21st-century American women